Thyridopteryx is a genus of bagworm moth.

Species
T. alcora
T. davidsoni
T. ephemeraeformis
T. meadii
T. rileyi

External links

Nearctica.com (as of 2002-06-26)

Psychidae
Psychidae genera